Guggenheim Fellowships are grants that have been awarded annually since  by the John Simon Guggenheim Memorial Foundation to those "who have demonstrated exceptional capacity for productive scholarship or exceptional creative ability in the arts."

Each year, the foundation issues awards in each of two separate competitions:
 One open to citizens and permanent residents of the United States and Canada. 
 The other to citizens and permanent residents of Latin America and the Caribbean. The Latin America and Caribbean competition is currently suspended "while we examine the workings and efficacy of the program. The U.S. and Canadian competition is unaffected by this suspension."

The performing arts are excluded, although composers, film directors, and choreographers are eligible. The fellowships are not open to students, only to "advanced professionals in mid-career" such as published authors. The fellows may spend the money as they see fit, as the purpose is to give fellows "blocks of time in which they can work with as much creative freedom as possible," but they should also be "substantially free of their regular duties." Applicants are required to submit references as well as a CV and portfolio.

The Foundation receives between 3,500 and 4,000 applications every year. Approximately 175 Fellowships are awarded each year. The size of grant varies and will be adjusted to the needs of Fellows, considering their other resources and the purpose and scope of their plans. The average grant in the 2008 Canada and United States competition was approximately US$43,200.

University Affiliation of Guggenheim Fellows 
Since the inaugural class of 1925, over 18,000 fellowships have been awarded.  Harvard counts the most affiliated fellows at 176, followed by Yale at 102, Princeton at 96, Berkeley at 73, and Columbia at 72.

† Harvard includes Radcliffe and Columbia includes Barnard

Lists of Guggenheim Fellows

See also 
 MacArthur Fellows Program
 Thomas J. Watson Fellowship

References

External links 
 List of Guggenheim Fellows

 
Awards established in 1925
1925 establishments in the United States
Articles with tables in need of attention